The Nojima Sagamihara Rise are an American football team located in Sagamihara City, Kanagawa, Japan.  They are a member of the X-League.

Similar to how fellow X-League member Elecom Kobe Finies's visual identity is inspired by the National Football League's Dallas Cowboys, the Nojima Sagamihara Rise's visual identity is inspired by the Denver Broncos, primarily in respect to its colors (navy blue and orange), logo (A charging horse with a flame-like mane) and uniforms (The Rise's home jersey is navy blue with orange accents - similar to the Broncos' 1997-2011 home jersey/2012-present alternate jersey), though the shade of orange which the Rise uses is closer to red.

Team history
2009 Team founded. First named Sagamihara Rise. Promoted from X3 to X2 at the end of the year.
2010 Won X-League replacement game. Promoted from X2 to X1 for the following year.
2011 Naming rights contract with the Nojima Corporation. Team name changed to Nojima Sagamihara Rise. Advanced to the Final Stage.
2012 Advanced to the Final stage for the 2nd consecutive year.
2015 Advanced to the Final stage. Lost to eventual champion Panasonic Impulse 45-17.

Seasons

Current import players

Former import players

References

External links
  (Japanese)

American football in Japan
2009 establishments in Japan
American football teams established in 2009
X-League teams